Slanes is a civil parish and townland (of 197 acres) in County Down, Northern Ireland. It is situated in the historic barony of Ards Upper.

Townlands
Slanes civil parish contains the following townlands:

Ardminnan
Ballyspurge
Dooey
Newcastle
Slanes

See also
List of civil parishes of County Down

References

 
Townlands of County Down